More Than Blue: The Series is a Taiwanese romance drama. It is an adaptation of the eponymous 2009 South Korean film More Than Blue and the Taiwanese remake More Than Blue. The series premiered on Netflix on October 22, 2021. It received 9 nominations at the 57th Golden Bell Awards and went on to win Best Directing for a Miniseries or Television Film for  Hsieh Pei-ru and Best Supporting Actor in a Miniseries or Television Film for Bai Run-yin.

Cast

Main 
 Fandy Fan as Chang Che-kai (a.k.a. K), a composer
 Gingle Wang as Sung Yuan-yuan (a.k.a. Cream), a lyricist
 Wang Po-chieh as Wang Po-han, a music producer
 Shao Yu-wei as An Yi-chi (a.k.a. An-an), E SHINE's employee
 Yao Yi-ti as Yu Chen-hsi (a.k.a. Cindy), a photographer, Yu-hsien's girlfriend
 Figaro Tseng as Yang Yu-hsien, a dentist, Cindy's boyfriend

Recurring 
 Ma Nian-sian as Mr. Chi, the owner of Pop-Hit
 Tsai Jia-yin as Bonnie, a famous singer
 Yuan Ai-fei as Huang Shu-hui (a.k.a. Kung Li-na), an actress, Po-han's ex-girlfriend
 Oscar Chiu as Oscar, E SHINE's employee, Po-han's assistant
 Wu Kun-da as Chang Kun-cheng, Che-kai's father
 Vera Chen as Cream's aunt
 Runyin Bai as An Ke-le, An-an's son
 Li Guan-yi as Pang, K's friend
 Wang Ke-yuan as Su Kuo-pei, Che-kai's friend
 Winnie Chang as Tseng Yu-hsia, Che-kai's mother
 Chiu Hao-chi as Lai Chun-chieh, Yi-chi's ex-boyfriend, Ke-le's bio father
 Lu Wen-hsueh as Yang Yao-lung, Yu-hsien's father
 Ahn Zhe as Jen Kuang, Cindy's ex-boyfriend

Special appearance 
 A-Lin as herself, a famous singer
 Chen Yu as Chen Xian-an (a.k.a. Hsiao-kuai), Cindy's assistant

Episodes

References

External links 
 
 

Taiwanese drama television series
Romantic drama television series
Mandarin-language Netflix original programming
2021 Taiwanese television series debuts
Television series about cancer
Live action television shows based on films